Under the Tree may refer to:

 "Under the Tree" (song), a 2005 song by The Water Babies
 "Under the Tree" (SiM song), a 2023 song by Japanese band SiM
 Under the Tree (2008 film), a 2008 film by Garin Nugroho
 Under the Tree (2017 film), a 2017 Icelandic film